A number of  elections on the federal and local level took place in Mexico during 2006.

Federal election

A general election was held on Sunday, July 2, 2006. Voters went to the polls to elect, on the federal level:

A new President of the Republic
A new Congress (both chambers)

The Federal Electoral Institute (IFE) is the  public organization responsible for organizing the general election in Mexico.

Local elections
In addition to the general election in July 2006, 12 states and the  Federal District (Mexico City) held local elections during the course of the year.

See also
Politics of Mexico
List of political parties in Mexico

References

Further reading
Bruhn, Kathleen, and Kenneth F. Greene. "Elite Polarization Meets Mass Moderation in Mexico's 2006 Elections." PS: Political Science & Politics 40.1 (2007): 33-38.
Lawson, Chappell, et al. "The Mexico 2006 Panel Study." Cambridge, MA: Massachusetts Institute of Technology, online:<http://mexicopanelstudy.mit.edu/>(10 May 2016) (2007).